Jacek Szopiński (born 5 January 1964) is a Polish former ice hockey player and coach. He played for Podhale Nowy Targ, HC Morzine-Avoriaz, and GKS Katowice during his career. Szopiński also played for the Polish national team at the 1988 Winter Olympics and several World Championships.

References

External links
 

1964 births
Living people
GKS Katowice (ice hockey) players
HC Morzine-Avoriaz players
Ice hockey players at the 1988 Winter Olympics
Olympic ice hockey players of Poland
People from Nowy Targ
Podhale Nowy Targ players
Polish ice hockey coaches
Polish ice hockey centres
Poland men's national ice hockey team coaches